Montello is a suburb of the city of Burnie in North West Tasmania.

History 
Montello is located on a hill near central Burnie, with the name assigned around 1903. The highest point in Montello is about 130 metres above sea level, near the intersection of Tattersall and Jorgensen streets.

The main road through Montello, View Road, was renamed from Old Mooreville Road in 1924, to avoid confusion with the new Mooreville Road.Elizabeth Street was renamed from Edward Street in 1942, to avoid confusion with Edwardes Street in South Burnie. The new name was suggested by Mr E. Tracey, the son of the original owner of the land. The first section of the Garner's Estate subdivision of government housing was approved in January 1945, with the Agricultural Bank involved. Jorgensen, Morse, Oates and Truganini streets were named on the plans. Plans for the subdivision by Van Diemen's Land Company were issued in 1949. Montello was gazetted as a locality in 1966.

The Jorgenson Street Reserve takes its name from Jørgen Jørgensen who worked for the Van Diemen's Land Company in the 1820s.

Geography
Most of the boundaries are survey lines.

Road infrastructure
Route A2 (Bass Highway) passes to the north-east. From there, Mount Street or West Park Grove can be used to reach View Road.

Education 
Montello Primary School
Maddingtons Child Care Services

Sport 

Montello has a side in the Burnie Netball Association roster.

References

External links 
Montello Primary School

Suburbs of Burnie, Tasmania